Lowdon is both a surname and a given name. Notable people with the name include:
Elsie Motz Lowdon ((1883–1960), American painter of portrait miniatures
Graeme Lowdon (born 1965), British businessman
Syd Lowdon (1936–2017), English rugby league player
Lowdon Heller (1924–2016), American politician

See also
Ann Lowdon Call (1945–2007), American equestrian